Dislocation Blues is a collaborative studio album, credited to American singer-songwriter and guitarist, Chris Whitley and Australian musician, Jeff Lang. The album was recorded in studios between Adelaide and Melbourne in April 2005, seven months before Chris Whitley's death from lung cancer.

The album was released in Australia in August 2006 and peaked at number 64 on the ARIA Charts, becoming the highest-charting album in Australia for both artists.

At the ARIA Music Awards of 2007, the album was nominated for ARIA Award for Best Blues and Roots Album.

Reception
Thom Jurek from AllMusic said "This collection of traditional blues tunes such as 'Stagger Lee' covers of Bob Dylan's 'When I Paint My Masterpiece' and 'Changing of the Guard' and originals from the catalogs of both men is an intimate, loose, deeply intuitive, and complementary set".

Track listing
 "Stagger Lee" (Traditional; arranged by Jeff Lang and Chris Whitley) – 7:26
 "Twelve Thousand Miles" (Jeff Lang) – 4:36
 "When I Paint My Masterpiece" (Bob Dylan) – 5:00
 "Rocket House" (Chris Whitley) – 5:09
 "The Road Leads Down" (Jeff Lang) – 2:52
 "Dislocation Blues" (Chris Whitley) – 5:27
 "Forever in My Life" (Prince Rogers Nelson – Prince) – 3:55
 "Velocity Girl" (Chris Whitley) – 4:52
 "Ravenswood" (Jeff Lang) – 5:23
 "Underground" (Jeff Lang, Chris Whitley, Grant Cummerford, Ashley Davies) – 4:19
 "Changing of the Guards" (Bob Dylan) – 6:42
 "Motion Bride" (Chris Whitley, Jeff Lang) – 1:26
 "Hellhound on My Trail" (live) (Robert Johnson) (hidden track) – 5:49
 "Kick the Stones" (live) (Chris Whitley) (hidden track) – 4:59

Personnel
Chris Whitley – vocals, guitars
Jeff Lang – vocals, guitars, chumbush, banjo
Grant Cummerford – bass
Ash Davies – drums

Charts

References

2006 albums
Albums published posthumously
Chris Whitley albums
Jeff Lang albums